Gena the Crocodile is a 1969 Soviet stop motion animated film directed by Roman Kachanov in Soyuzmultfilm studio. This film introduces the characters Gena the Crocodile, Cheburashka, and the old lady Shapoklyak. The film was based on Eduard Uspensky's stories about the characters.

This film was popular in the Soviet Union and spawned three sequels: Cheburashka (1972), Shapoklyak (1974) and Cheburashka Goes to School (1983).

Plot summary
Gena the Crocodile works as a zoo animal at an urban zoo. Every evening, he returns home to his lonely apartment. Gena gets very tired of playing chess against himself and decides to find some friends to play with. Animals and people respond to advertisements that he posts all around the city. First, a girl named Galya comes with a homeless puppy, who is then followed by Cheburashka. They decide to build a house for all the lonely citizens of the city, but a mischievous old lady, Shapoklyak, tries to stop them in different ways.

Creators
Scriptwriters: Eduard Uspensky, Roman Kachanov
Film director: Roman Kachanov
Art director: Leonid Shvartsman
Operator: Iosif Golomb
Composer: Mikhail Ziv
Sound technician: Georgy Martynyuk
Dolls and scenery: Semyon Etlis, Marina Chesnokova, Pavel Lesin, Gennady Lyutinsky, Svetlana Znamenskaya, Oleg Masainov, Valentin Ladygin, Liliana Luetinskaja, V. Kalashnikova, E. Darikovich
Installation: Lidiya Kyaksht

Cast
Vasily Livanov as Gena the Crocodile (voice)
Klara Rumyanova as Cheburashka (voice)
Vladimir Rautbart as Shapoklyak (voice)
Vladimir Kenigson as Salesman (voice)
Tamara Dmitrieva as Galya (voice)

References

External links
Gena the Crocodile at Animator.ru
 Gena the Crocodile on Russian Film Hub
 

1969 films
1960s stop-motion animated films
Animated films about crocodilians
Films based on works by Eduard Uspensky
Films directed by Roman Abelevich Kachanov
Russian animated films
1960s Russian-language films
Soviet animated films
Soyuzmultfilm